Kurangani is a hill station atop the Western Ghats accessed from Bodinayakkanur in the Indian state of Tamil Nadu. Kurangani literally means " The place which wears monkeys as its jewels" in Tamil.

Economy 
It has estates that grow coconut, mangoes, all spices, and coffee. Trekking in the hills also substantially contributes to the economy of Kurangani. The forest resource of this region was completely burnt in the 2018 fire.

Geography 
A mountain stream passes between Kurangani mountains in the east and Kolukkumalai in the west. The hills are characterized by frequently-changing weather, low-hanging clouds, chilly atmosphere and strong winds, and are home to a wide range of flora and fauna including Indian gaurs, barking deer, langurs, wild cats, leopards and tigers.

Kurangani has more than 6 small streams. All join together into the Kottakudi River, where they then flow into Vaigai Dam.

Attractions 
The Kurangani Hills near Bodinayakkanur in Theni district are suitable for trekking and nature walks, including the 12 km walk from Kurangani village to Top Station through the central village. Those who visit Munnar in Kerala can also enter the trekking route by walking down the dense woods and plain grasslands. It takes four to five hours to complete the trek from Kurangani village, the foothills of the Hills, to reach Top station, while two-and-a-half hours is enough for the return trip. Hikes begin 35 km from Munnar and reach Top Station Theni district.

The films Alagar Samiyin Kuthurai, Myna and Kumki were shot there. The best months to explore the Hills are from August to December.

Samabalaru falls is the source of Kottakudi river which serves the drinking water needs of Bodinayakanur. 

The central village has a population of 200 people and 50 houses. Lodging is available in Top Station, Bodinayakanur and Munnar. along with two cottages in the central village.

Access 
BY AIR: Nearest airport is at Madurai, 101 km from Kurangani.
BY ROAD: From Madurai or any other close by town or city, taxi and bus services are available for Kurangani. The 16-km uphill drive from Bodinayakanur to Kurangani
BY TRAIN: Bodinayakkanur is the nearest station, 16 km from Kurangani (construction in process).
 15 km road connecting Kurangani and Bodinayakanur
 Buses, jeeps and autos available from Bodinayakanur

References 
Hills of Tamil Nadu